In Babylonian mythology, Kulilu is a destructive spirit, half man, half fish.

References

External links 
 http://melammu-project.eu/database/gen_tpl/t02/t0000220.html

Mesopotamian legendary creatures
Mythological human hybrids